Pascal Chimbonda (born 21 February 1979) is a French former professional footballer who played as a right-back.

Chimbonda began his professional career in 1998 with Le Havre, where he featured over 100 times combined for the club's first team and B team before moving to Bastia in 2003. In 2005, he moved to Premier League club Wigan Athletic for their first ever season in the top flight. At Wigan, his tremendous season earned him a place in the Premier League Team of the Year. But on the last day of the 2005–06 season, he handed in a transfer request. He was subsequently signed by Tottenham Hotspur that summer. After two seasons with Spurs he later moved on to fellow top flight club Sunderland before briefly returning to Spurs in 2009. In the summer of 2009 he signed for Blackburn Rovers which is where he remained until 2011 when he joined Football Championship club Queens Park Rangers. During the 2011–12 season he was one of a number of ex Premier League players who turned out for Doncaster Rovers but he went on to be released at the end of the season. Having remained clubless for the following year, Chimbonda dropped six leagues down to sign non-contract terms with Market Drayton Town, remaining at them briefly before joining Carlisle. He retired following a short stint with AC Arles-Avignon. In 2017 he came out of retirement and spent two spells with English non-League sides Washington and Ashton Town.

Despite initially playing his international football for Guadeloupe, Chimbonda went on to be selected for the France squad for the 2006 World Cup, but he was an unused substitute in each of France's matches including the final, in which they lost on a penalty shoot-out to Italy. His only French cap came in a World Cup warm-up match against Denmark.

Club career

Early career
Chimbonda was born in Les Abymes, Guadeloupe. He began his career at Le Havre in France in 1999, making his debut against Strasbourg on 29 April 2000. He spent four years with the club, until Le Havre were relegated to Ligue 2, when he transferred to Bastia. During his stay at Bastia, Chimbonda received racist taunts from his own fans after a heavy loss against Saint-Étienne; this may have contributed to his leaving the club. However, his former teammates at Bastia firmly denied Chimbonda's accusations of racism.

After Bastia were relegated in July 2005, he left the club, turning down an offer from Marseille, and moved to Wigan Athletic for £500,000 on a three-year contract. He cited the fact that he was "ready for a new challenge and coming to Wigan is the perfect opportunity to test myself against the best players in the world" as the reason for selecting Wigan Athletic.

Wigan Athletic
After signing for Wigan Athletic, Chimbonda was one of the stars of the Latics' first ever season in the Premier League. He played 44 times for the club in all competitions and featured in all but one game of the 2005–06 Premier League season. He scored two goals for the club, both in the 2005–06 season, in consecutive league games against Fulham and Portsmouth. After a hugely successful first season in English football, Chimbonda was named in the PFA Team of the Year for the 2005–06 season, having been voted as best right back in the Premiership, ahead of Gary Neville, Steve Finnan and Paulo Ferreira. Whilst at Wigan he started in the 2006 Football League Cup Final.

He was linked with a move to a range of clubs and was subject to an offer from West Ham United based on a clause in his contract that allowed him to switch clubs for an offer of £1 million – which was subsequently renegotiated and removed. On the final day of the 2005–06 season, he handed in a transfer request after Wigan lost 4–2 to Arsenal in the final game played at Arsenal's old Highbury ground, only six months after renegotiating his contract for a further four years. This riled the Wigan management, who set a high price – higher than many prospective buyers were willing to pay – and informed Chimbonda that he could "play in the reserves until his contract is over", if he was not bought.

Tottenham Hotspur replied with a £2 million transfer offer and then a £3 million offer; however, both were rejected, as Wigan had stated that any offers below £6 million would not be accepted, despite previously stating that, according to his agent Willie McKay, "they wouldn't step in the player's way if a top club came in for him". Further, according to McKay, £3 million "was a terrific offer", and Chimbonda was still hopeful of a move to Tottenham. Chimbonda has stated that "moving to Tottenham will help me take the next step forward", and has called Wigan a "stepping stone". West Ham also made a bid, reportedly £4 million, for the player, though this was also turned down because it fell short of the asking price.

He made his last appearance for Wigan on 26 August 2006 in a win against Reading as a substitute. He replaced Emile Heskey in the 79th minute, Heskey having scored the winning goal earlier. He eventually joined Tottenham on transfer deadline day, 31 August 2006, after a summer of negotiations.

Tottenham Hotspur
On 31 August 2006, Wigan Athletic accepted a bid from Tottenham Hotspur of £4.5 million, with the transfer being completed just before midnight. He made his Tottenham debut against Manchester United on 9 September 2006.

Chimbonda played in a 2–1 victory over Chelsea in which it later transpired he had played on with knee ligament damage resulting from a strong challenge by Frank Lampard in the opening minutes of the game. Tottenham manager Martin Jol singled out Chimbonda after the match as the best example of the players' spirit and character that day. However, on 14 January 2007 Chimbonda was involved in a controversial incident in his team's match against Newcastle United when he slapped Nicky Butt in the face with his glove; an incident that provoked a skirmish between the members of the two teams.

He scored the equaliser, and his first goal for Tottenham on 20 January 2007 in the 1–1 draw with Fulham. He started for Spurs in the 2008 Football League Cup Final victory over Chelsea. On 12 March 2008, he missed an important penalty kick in a penalty shoot-out, following a series of penalties at the end of the match with PSV Eindhoven in the UEFA Cup. PSV went to the next round (quarter finals) and Tottenham were knocked out.

Sunderland
On 26 July 2008, Chimbonda signed for Sunderland, joining up with former teammates Teemu Tainio and Steed Malbranque.

Return to Tottenham Hotspur
On 26 January 2009, Chimbonda underwent a medical at Tottenham Hotspur ahead of a proposed return to White Hart Lane and the deal was completed the following day. Sunderland manager Ricky Sbragia declined to reveal the fee, although it is thought that Sunderland would recoup what they originally paid for Chimbonda, somewhere around the £3 million mark. His second Tottenham debut came in a 3–2 defeat against Bolton Wanderers on 31 January, where he set up Darren Bent to pull one back for Spurs, after coming on as a substitute. He was cup-tied for Spurs' appearance in the 2009 Football League Cup Final. During this second spell with Tottenham he appeared in 5 games in all competitions including playing in three league matches, and the other two matches he featured in were in the UEFA Cup.

Blackburn Rovers
On 27 August 2009, Chimbonda joined Blackburn Rovers on a two-year contract for an undisclosed fee, believed to be in the region of £2.5 million. He made his debut against West Ham United on 29 August, in the 0–0 draw. On 18 October 2009, Chimbonda scored his first goal for the club in the East Lancashire derby against Burnley at Ewood Park in the 3–2 victory. At the end of this season, Chimbonda made 29 appearances, and scored one goal in all competitions. In January 2011 Blackburn Rovers agreed to terminate Chimbonda's contract with immediate effect.

Queens Park Rangers
On 21 January 2011, Chimbonda signed for Queens Park Rangers on a six-month contract, reportedly taking a 75% pay cut to join. Chimbonda made his debut against Nottingham Forest coming on as a substitute on the 73rd minute. On 21 April 2011 it was confirmed that Chimbonda was to be released by Queens Park Rangers and would not play for the club again after manager Neil Warnock stated that the club was not prepared to offer him a long-term deal.

Doncaster Rovers
On 28 September 2011, Chimbonda signed a short-term deal with Championship club Doncaster Rovers. Upon signing for Rovers, Chimbonda joined his sixth English club, and became manager Dean Saunders' first signing at the club. He made his debut on 18 October, against Blackpool, but five games later suffered an injury which kept him out for the rest of 2011. On 29 December, Chimbonda signed a new six-month contract at Keepmoat Stadium, meaning he would stay until the end of the season.

Later career
After leaving Doncaster Rovers at the end of the 2011–12 season, Chimbonda played no part in the following season. A move to Chicago Fire fell through, and he remained a free agent throughout the entire 2012–13 season. In July 2013 Chimbonda began training with Northern Premier League Division One South side Market Drayton Town and played in the club's pre-season friendly with Notts County. He also played on trial for League One side Tranmere Rovers. After failing to earn a deal with Tranmere, Chimbonda returned to Market Drayton on a non-contract basis, also announcing that he would play for free.

On 18 October 2013, Chimbonda signed a three-month contract with League One side Carlisle United.

On 1 October 2014, Chimbonda signed with French Ligue 2 side AC Arles-Avignon. He was released in February 2015 having played four games in Ligue 2, scoring no goals and receiving three yellow cards. Chimbonda initially retired from playing following his release by Arles-Avignon.

On 5 October 2017, Chimbonda came out of retirement and signed with non-league side Washington.

In January 2019, Chimbonda signed a one-month contract with Ashton Town of the North West Counties League Division One North. He made his Ashton Town debut in a 6–2 home victory over Bacup Borough. He left the club in March having made four appearances.

International career

Guadeloupe
In 2003, he played three matches for Guadeloupe in the Caribbean qualifiers for the 2003 CONCACAF Gold Cup.

In 2012, he represented Guadeloupe during qualifications to the 2012 Caribbean Cup (Second Round, Group 7), playing in games against Martinique, Puerto Rico and Dominican Republic.

France
Despite early concerns that he would not make France's 2006 World Cup squad, he was selected on the quality of his performances for Wigan in the Premier League. During a World Cup warm-up friendly match, a 2–0 win against Denmark on 31 May 2006, he appeared amongst the substitutes, appearing briefly on the pitch in the final minutes of the game in the 87th minute for his debut. Chimbonda did not make an appearance during the 2006 World Cup, the cap against Denmark was his only appearance for the national side.

Honours
Wigan Athletic
Football League Cup runner-up: 2005–06

Tottenham Hotspur
Football League Cup: 2007–08

France
FIFA World Cup runner-up: 2006

Individual
PFA Team of the Year: 2005–06 Premier League

References

External links

1979 births
Living people
People from Les Abymes
French footballers
French people of Guadeloupean descent
French expatriate sportspeople in England
French expatriate footballers
France international footballers
Guadeloupean footballers
Guadeloupe international footballers
Association football defenders
Le Havre AC players
SC Bastia players
Wigan Athletic F.C. players
Tottenham Hotspur F.C. players
Sunderland A.F.C. players
Blackburn Rovers F.C. players
Queens Park Rangers F.C. players
Doncaster Rovers F.C. players
Market Drayton Town F.C. players
Ligue 1 players
Premier League players
English Football League players
2006 FIFA World Cup players
Expatriate footballers in England
Dual internationalists (football)
Carlisle United F.C. players
AC Arlésien players
Washington F.C. players
Ashton Town A.F.C. players
Black French sportspeople